Giovanni Lonardi (born 9 November 1996 in Verona) is an Italian cyclist, who currently rides for UCI ProTeam . In May 2019, he was named in the startlist for the 2019 Giro d'Italia.

Major results

2016
 6th Circuito del Porto
2017
 2nd Circuito del Porto
 4th Popolarissima
 6th Gran Premio della Liberazione
2018
 1st Circuito del Porto
 1st Popolarissima
 1st Stage 1 Giro Ciclistico d'Italia
 6th Trofeo Piva
 9th ZLM Tour
2019
 Tour of Thailand
1st  Points classification
1st Stage 1
 1st Stage 5 Tour de Taiwan
 2nd Tour of Antalya
2020 
 1st Stage 2 Tour of Antalya
2021
 1st Stage 1 Tour of Bulgaria
 3rd Circuito del Porto
 6th Per sempre Alfredo 
 6th GP Slovenia
 7th Trofeo Alcudia – Port d'Alcudia
2022
 1st Clàssica Comunitat Valenciana 1969

Grand Tour general classification results timeline

References

External links

1996 births
Living people
Italian male cyclists
Sportspeople from Verona
Cyclists from the Province of Verona